KAMA or Kama may refer to:

 Korea Automobile Manufacturers Association
 KAMA (AM), a radio station (750 AM) licensed to El Paso, Texas, United States
 KAMA-FM, a radio station (104.9 FM) licensed to Deer Park, Texas, United States
 Kama, a professional wrestling gimmick portrayed by Charles Wright (wrestler)
 the ICAO code for Rick Husband Amarillo International Airport
 Kama, Sanskrit word for pleasure.
 Kama, a traditional Estonian, Finnish and Russian finely milled flour mixture